Air University (Hangul: 공군대학, Hanja: 空軍大學) was a university located in Yuseong-gu, South Korea. The university was closed in 2011.

References

External links
 Air University (Archive) 

Yuseong District
Republic of Korea Air Force
Military academies of South Korea
Universities and colleges in Daejeon
Educational institutions established in 1956
1956 establishments in South Korea
Educational institutions disestablished in 2011
2011 disestablishments in South Korea
Defunct military academies